Dan Roberts (born May 22, 1967) is the bassist for the Canadian rock band, Crash Test Dummies, and brother of their lead singer, Brad Roberts.

Biography
Roberts joined Crash Test Dummies just before they began putting together their first album, The Ghosts That Haunt Me. He got interested in joining after he heard the five song demo.

He is known to enjoy photography, and his work was used on the album artwork for I Don't Care That You Don't Mind and Jingle All the Way.

In 2002 Dan played guitar for Ellen Reid on her Cinderellen tour and on that same year was involved with the recording of the Dummies' Christmas album titled, Jingle All The Way.

"I live a very normal type life. When I get off the road I'm usually busy catching up on stuff around the house, and hanging out with my wife. I'm interested in photography, so I do some of that. I'm a big hockey fan, so I try to catch some games. It's kind of hard to get into too much, as there always seems to be some sort of Dummy related thing to do just around the corner."

More recently Roberts was involved in the Crash Test Dummies' album, Puss 'n' Boots.

A keen amateur cook, he won Canadian Living magazine's 'Cook of the Year' in 2006.

References

1967 births
Living people
Canadian rock bass guitarists
Crash Test Dummies members
Musicians from Winnipeg